The 2020 Turkmenistan Higher League (Ýokary Liga) season is the 28th season Turkmenistan's professional football league, the highest football league competition in Turkmenistan. Altyn Asyr are the defending champions from the 2019 campaign.

Season events 
On 23 March 2020, the league was suspended. It resumed on 19 April.

On August 17, all tournaments under the auspices of the Football Federation of Turkmenistan were suspended again.

Teams and clubs locations 
In February 2020, the Turkmenistan Football Federation announced that the season would involve 8 teams, with there being 112 matches in four rounds. The teams consist of FC Altyn Asyr, FC Ashgabat, FC Ahal, FC Shagadam, FC Nebitchi, FC Energetik, FC Merw, FC Kopetdag.

Managerial changes

Personnel, kit and sponsoring

League table

Fixtures and results

Matches (1–14)

Matches (15–28)

Season statistics

Scoring

Top scorers

Clean sheets

Best Yokary Liga 2020 Players

Best 11

Second Top 11

References

External links 
 Ýokary Liga 2020
 Football Federation of Turkmenistan
 Turkmenistan Sport News

Turkmenistan
Ýokary Liga seasons
2020 in Turkmenistani football
Yokary Liga, 2020